Parminder Phangura (born ) is a Canadian male weightlifter, competing in the +105 kg category and representing Canada at international competitions. He competed at world championships, such as the 2011 World Weightlifting Championships. He participated at the 2010 Commonwealth Games in the +105 kg event.

Major results

References

1979 births
Living people
Canadian male weightlifters
Canadian people of Indian descent
Place of birth missing (living people)
Weightlifters at the 2014 Commonwealth Games
Weightlifters at the 2010 Commonwealth Games
Commonwealth Games competitors for Canada
20th-century Canadian people
21st-century Canadian people